The Bell V-280 Valor is a tiltrotor aircraft being developed by Bell Helicopter with Lockheed Martin for the United States Army's Future Vertical Lift (FVL) program. The aircraft was officially unveiled at the 2013 Army Aviation Association of America's (AAAA) Annual Professional Forum and Exposition in Fort Worth, Texas. The V-280 made its first flight on 18 December 2017 in Amarillo, Texas.

On 5 December 2022, the V-280 was chosen by the US Army as the winner of the Future Long-Range Assault Aircraft program to replace the Sikorsky UH-60 Black Hawk.

Development
In June 2013, Bell Helicopter announced that the V-280 Valor design had been selected by the US Army for the Joint Multi-Role (JMR) Technology Demonstrator (TD) phase.  The JMR-TD phase is the technology demonstration precursor to Future Vertical Lift (FVL).  The Army classified the offering as a Category I proposal, meaning it is a well-conceived, scientifically or technically sound proposal pertinent to program goals and objectives with applicability to Army mission needs, offered by a responsible contractor with the competent scientific and technical staff supporting resources required to achieve results.  JMR-TD contracts were expected to be awarded in September 2013, with flights scheduled for 2017.

In September 2013, Bell announced it would partner with Lockheed Martin to develop the V-280.  Lockheed will provide integrated avionics, sensors, and weapons to the aircraft.  Additional partners were announced in the following months, including Moog Inc. for the flight control systems, GE Aviation for the engines, GKN for the tail structure, Spirit AeroSystems for the composite fuselage, Eaton Corporation as the distributor of hydraulics and power generation systems, and Astronics Advanced Electric Systems to design and manufacture power distribution systems. Israel Aerospace Industries, the first international partner recruited for the V-280, will supply the nacelle structures. Textron sister company TRU Simulation & Training will build a high-fidelity marketing simulator and desktop maintenance trainer.

In October 2013, the U.S. Army awarded a technology investment agreement (TIA) to Bell for the V-280 Valor tiltrotor under the Joint Multi-Role program.  Awards were also given to AVX Aircraft, Karem Aircraft, and a Sikorsky-Boeing team.  The JMR program is not intended to develop a prototype for the next family of vehicles, but to develop technologies and interfaces.  The TIAs give the four teams nine months to complete preliminary design of their rotorcraft, which the Army will then review and authorize the construction of two competing demonstrators to fly in 2017.  While there is a potential for an early downselect, the four teams are focused on the 2017 flight demonstrations. Each of the four teams received $6.5 million from the Army for phase I of the program, although Bell is investing an undisclosed amount of its own money. On 21 October 2013, Bell unveiled the first full-scale mock-up of the V-280 Valor at Association of the United States Army 2013.

On 11 August 2014, the Army informed the Bell-Lockheed team that they had chosen the V-280 Valor to continue with the JMR demonstration program.  The Boeing-Sikorsky team offering the SB-1 Defiant was also chosen. Announcement of the selections was officially made on 3 October 2014, and the teams began building technology demonstration aircraft for test flights in 2017. Bell unveiled a full-scale mock-up of the V-280 Valor on the floor at AUSA 2014 to showcase the configuration and design of the high-speed platform.  It is focused on the infantry squad and is to handle much like a helicopter in terms of low-speed agility to have unprecedented pitch, roll, and yaw response for those operations.  Roughly the size of the current medium-lift helicopter, the V-280 is designed to travel twice as fast and twice as far.  Bell is pitching these capabilities for movement over vast areas like the Pacific. The program director said the need for forward arming and refueling points could be eliminated and that one FOB (forward operating base) in the middle of a country, such as Afghanistan, could cover the entire country.

Although Bell sold its share in the AW609 program in 2011, Bell continues to work on the AW609 and considers commercial potential for the V-280, as a military mass production of 2,000–4,000 aircraft could reduce unit cost to commercially acceptable levels. In 2016, Bell stated that it preferred the 609 for commercial use, and intended to offer the V-280 for military use only. Bell also stated that conventional helicopters were not part of Bell's military future.

Prototype

In June 2015, Bell's subcontractor Spirit AeroSystems began assembly of the composite fuselage for the first prototype V-280 Valor, which was delivered in September 2015. In total, the design and manufacturing of the fuselage was completed in only 22 months. Although the V-280 is initially planned for the JMR demonstration program, Bell does not anticipate much difference between it and a final FVL entry. By January 2016, the V-280 demonstrator was 23 percent complete, with the fuselage and wings mated together in early May 2016.  The demonstrator aircraft began ground vibration testing in Amarillo in February 2017, with the aircraft reaching 95 percent completion.

The demonstrator was undergoing ground testing in October 2017. Bell released a video on 18 December showing the first flight with the area around the pivots blurred. By the end of the month, it attained  with proprotors 60-deg. forward, and is planned to reach its airplane cruise configuration with horizontal pylons in summer. It reached  in cruise mode with horizontal propellers in May 2018.

After 155 hours of rotor turn time and 70 flight hours, by October 2018 it had reached  at 80% proprotor cruise speed. Its longest flight covered  as it performed a ferry flight to Arlington, Texas to continue testing closer to the US Army.

After one year of flight tests, it reached its  target by January 2019, as it will continue to expand its flight envelope: low-speed agility, bank angles, and autonomous operations.
In December 2020, the V-280 reached 305 kn (350 mph; 565 km/h) as it was flown for over 200 hours.

Design

In one major difference from the earlier V-22 Osprey tiltrotor, the engines remain in place while the rotors and drive shafts tilt. A driveshaft runs through the straight wing, allowing both prop rotors to be driven by a single engine in the event of engine loss. The V-280 will have retractable landing gear, a triple-redundant fly by wire control system, and a V-tail configuration. 

The wings are made of a single section of carbon fiber reinforced polymer composite, reducing weight and production costs. The V-280 will have a crew of four and be capable of transporting up to 14 troops. The fuselage is visually similar to that of the UH-60 Black Hawk medium lift helicopter.

Although the initial design is a utility configuration, Bell is also working on an attack configuration. Whether different variants of the V-280 would fill utility and attack roles or a single airframe could interchange payloads for either mission, Bell is confident the Valor tiltrotor platform can fulfill both duties. The U.S. Marine Corps is interested in having one aircraft to replace utility and attack helicopters, but the Army, which leads the program, is not committed to the idea and wants distinct platforms for each mission. Bell and Lockheed claim an AV-280 variant can launch rockets, missiles, and even small unmanned aerial vehicles forward or aft with no rotor interference, even in forward flight and cruise modes with the rotors forward.

The V-280 prototype (air vehicle concept demonstrator, or AVCD) was powered by the General Electric T64. The specific engine for the model performance specification (MPS) was unknown at the time, but has funding from the Army's future affordable turbine engine (FATE) program. The V-tail structure and ruddervators, made by GKN, will provide high levels of maneuverability and control to the airframe. It will be made of a combination of metals and composites. Features in the interior include seats that wirelessly charge troops’ radios, night-vision goggles, and other electronic gear and windows that display three-dimensional mission maps.

Special emphasis has been placed on reducing the weight of the V-280 in comparison to the V-22, which would reduce cost. To do this, composites are used extensively in the wing, fuselage, and tail. Wing skins and ribs are made of a honeycomb-stiffened "sandwich" construction with large-cell carbon cores for fewer, larger, and lighter parts. Skins and ribs are paste-bonded together to eliminate fasteners. With these measures, costs are reduced by over 30 percent compared to a scaled V-22 wing. Bell expects the V-280 to cost around the same as an AH-64E or MH-60M. While the Osprey has a higher disk loading and lower hover efficiency than a helicopter, the V-280 will have a lower disk loading and longer wing for greater hover and cruise efficiency.

In October 2021, Bell and Rolls-Royce jointly announced that the V-280 Valor powerplant would switch from the T64 turboshaft used on the prototype to a derivative of the Rolls-Royce T406/AE 1107C used on the Osprey, which would be named the AE 1107F. At the same time as increasing power from 5,000 to 7,000 horsepower, the AE 1107 is a known element in tiltrotor aircraft with its two decades of prior use, which lowers sustainment costs and decreases risks of the project.

Specifications

See also

References

External links

 Bell V-280 Valor web page
 Bell Helicopter – CEO Blog (archived)
 Images of the First Bell V-280 Valor on theaviationist.com
 Bell V-280 Valor on YouTube

Tiltrotor aircraft
Lockheed Martin aircraft
V-280 Valor
Aircraft first flown in 2017